The 2014 United States-China Cybersecurity agreement is an Executive agreement between the United States and the People's Republic of China. The agreement covers several areas of Cybersecurity policy, including on information sharing mechanisms and establishing that neither country will support cyber-enabled Intellectual property theft. The agreement was announced at a joint press conference attended by U.S. President Barack Obama and Chinese General Secretary Xi Jinping located at the White House lawn on September 25, 2015.

The agreement has been called ineffective by the Trump administration and others.

See also 

 Convention on Cybercrime

References  

Computer law treaties
Treaties concluded in 2015
Treaties entered into force in 2015
2015 U.S. China Cyber Agreement
International criminal law treaties
Telecommunications treaties